Angana Roy is an Indian actress, who has appeared majorly in South Indian Films and also Debuted in Hindi recently, her upcoming film  Dahini  is slotted to release in  Cannes Film Festival . She was seen in  Srimanthudu  with  Mahesh Babu, her upcoming releases are  kalaga Thalaivan  with  Udhayanidhi Stalin,  Arasi  with Varalaxmi Sarathkumar and  Dahini .

Career
Angana Roy is a south Indian film industry actress. Before venturing into films she pursued her academics in commerce and finance and holds a master's degree in the field. She was also a corporate HR in a fortune 500 firm. Alongside her education she is also trained  in classical Hindustani music and a very strong sports enthusiast. Being tall, she created a model portfolio and endorsed several brands across India, walked the ramp for many shows and later was approached by director Manohar to feature in his Tamil film Ragalaipuram, a comedy which starred Karunas. Before the release of the film, she also began work on Kabadam and the AR Murugadoss production Vathikuchi. by June 2012 She has since signed on to appear in Telugu and Kannada language films.

2014 she played a role with dual shades in Kabadam and was seen as a nurse in Megha. Her first 2015 release was her maiden Malayalam film Picket 43 directed by Major Ravi. In her next Tamil film, Mahabalipuram she played a "newly married, office going girl".

She has acted in Telugu projects, one of which is a big budget movie of Koratala Siva called "Srimanthudu" starring Mahesh Babu. which was a massive hit in Telugu after Baahubali. She had two more releases in Telugu in 2016, "Sri Sri (film)" with Superstar Krishna as his daughter which is an official remake of a state awarded Marathi film and another untitled project.
In 2016 she was also awarded with two awards namely 'Bharat Icon Awards' in Mumbai and as a 'Multi lingual actress' to have worked with all 4 languages in south Indian cinema..
In 2017 she received the Women Achievers State Award by the Karnataka Chief Minister  
"Siddaramaiah" and by the Mayor of Bangalore Miss "Padmavathi" for her long time contribution to the field of fashion and modelling and for her work in films and social welfare activities.

She was also the lead for a mega series in Colors Tamil television in prime time slot and another project with Star Vijay television which will be the first Fantasy series of Vijay TV.

Filmography

TV Series

References

External links

Indian film actresses
Actresses in Tamil cinema
Living people
Year of birth missing (living people)
21st-century Indian actresses
Actresses from Kolkata
Actresses in Kannada cinema
Actresses in Malayalam cinema
Actresses in Telugu cinema
Actresses in Tamil television